Kazuhito Watanabe (渡邊 一仁, born September 1, 1986) is a Japanese football player for Ehime FC.

Club statistics
Updated to 14 April 2020.

References

External links
Profile at Yokohama FC

1986 births
Living people
Tokyo Gakugei University alumni
Association football people from Ehime Prefecture
Japanese footballers
J2 League players
Ehime FC players
Fagiano Okayama players
Yokohama FC players
Association football midfielders